Tresse cheese, also known as jibneh mshallaleh (Arabic: جبنة مشللة) is a form of string cheese originating in Syria. It can be eaten plain, or mixed with pastries.

The cheese is properly mixed with mahleb, which is often mixed with nigella sativa (black cumin), anise or caraway seeds. It is soaked in brine for several weeks before being braided.

Described as a "fine white semi-soft smooth and springy cheese...similar to mozzarella" with a "nutty" aroma it is traditionally made from cow's milk, but variations are found with sheep or goat milk. It can be used as a substitute for Mexican Oaxaqueno cheese.

History
It is believed to have originated in Armenia as majdouleh, before being taken to Aleppo.

Availability
Canadian versions of the cheese are produced by Fromagerie Marie Kade in Boisbriand, Quebec.

See also
 List of cheeses

References

Further reading
 The Flower of Paradise and Other Armenian Tales, Virginia A. Tashjian - 2007

Arab cuisine
Syrian cheeses
Syrian cuisine